Islambek Yerzhanuly Kuat (İslambek Erjanūly Quat; born 12 January 1993) is a Kazakh footballer who plays for Astana and the Kazakhstan national team. Kuat scored his first goal for Kazakhstan on 10 October 2015 in a 2–1 defeat against the Netherlands in a UEFA Euro 2016 qualifier.

Career

Club
On 30 December 2019, FC Kairat confirmed Kuat's departure from the club at the end of his contract. On 1 January 2020, Russian Premier League club FC Orenburg announced the signing of Kuat. On 30 July 2020, his Orenburg contract was terminated by mutual consent.

On 11 September 2020 he joined Russian Premier League club FC Khimki. On 13 March 2021, his contract with Khimki was terminated by mutual consent.

On 16 March 2021, FC Astana announced that they had re-signed Kuat after he'd previously played for the club between 2010 and 2014.

International
Kuat became very well known in Turkey, thanks to his goal against Latvia, which enabled the Turkish team to qualify direct as the best third-placed side in the UEFA Euro 2016 qualifying. It was even suggested that a street in Istanbul be named in honour of Kuat, while more than one fan on social media promised to name their children in honour of the midfielder. A dozen Turkish fans presented him with gifts and a bouquet of flowers, and thanked him personally at half-time during Kairat's game against Atyrau on 17 October.

Career statistics

Club

International

International goals
Scores and results list Kazakhstan's goal tally first.

Honours

Club
 Kairat
 Kazakhstan Cup (2): 2014, 2015

References

1993 births
Sportspeople from Astana
Living people
Kazakhstani footballers
Kazakhstan international footballers
Association football defenders
Kazakhstan Premier League players
FC Aktobe players
FC Astana players
FC Okzhetpes players
FC Kairat players
FC Orenburg players
FC Khimki players
Kazakhstani expatriate footballers
Expatriate footballers in Russia
Russian Premier League players